Malaya Gora is a rural locality (a village) in Bogorodskoye Rural Settlement, Ust-Kubinsky District, Vologda Oblast, Russia. The population was 87 as of 2002. There are 2 streets.

Geography 
The distance to Ustye is 66.5 km, to Bogorodskoye is 16 km. Dmitriyevskaya is the nearest rural locality.

References 

Rural localities in Tarnogsky District